Howard Douglas Grant (c. 1939 – August 1, 2018) was an American Thoroughbred horse racing jockey. Born in Cincinnati, Ohio, he began his jockey apprenticeship as a seventeen-year-old at Wheeling Downs, West Virginia and won his first race on October 9, 1956, at Cranwood Park Race Course in Cleveland, Ohio. During his twenty-four-year career, he competed primarily at Middle Atlantic racetracks and in 1959 rode four winners on a single racecard at Bowie Race Track, repeating that feat again in 1968 at the Atlantic City Race Course. He died August 1, 2018, aged 79.

Riding titles
Grant won the Gulfstream Park riding title in 1963. In the early 1970s he began riding in California where he won an Oak Tree Racing Association and a Del Mar racetrack riding championship in 1971.

Like many jockeys, Howard Grant battled weight gain from early in his career, and by the middle part of the 1970s the problem frequently limited his number of mounts.

References

1930s births
2018 deaths
American jockeys
Sportspeople from Cincinnati